"Undercova Funk (Give Up the Funk)" is a song by American rapper Snoop Dogg featuring Mr. Kane, Bootsy Collins, Quaze and Fred Wesley. It was released in May 2002 as the single for the soundtrack to the 2002 film Undercover Brother on the record label Hollywood Records. The song samples "Give Up the Funk (Tear the Roof off the Sucker)" by Parliament, which Bootsy Collins was a part of. The music video was directed by Gregory Dark and features Eddie Griffin, Denise Richards, and Aunjanue Ellis, all of whom appear in the film.

Track listing
CD single
"Undercova Funk (Give Up The Funk)" (Radio Edit) (featuring Mr. Kane, Bootsy Collins, Quaze and Fred Wesley) — 4:01
"Undercova Funk (Give Up The Funk)" (Album Version) (featuring Mr. Kane, Bootsy Collins, Quaze and Fred Wesley) — 3:24

Chart performance

Weekly charts

References

2002 singles
Snoop Dogg songs
Bootsy Collins songs
Songs written by Snoop Dogg
Songs written by Bootsy Collins
2002 songs
Songs written by George Clinton (funk musician)
Hollywood Records singles
Music videos directed by Gregory Dark